Petr Hudeček (born 30 August 1965) is a Czech weightlifter. He competed for Czechoslovakia. He participated at the Olympic Games in 1988, where he placed fifth in the men's super heavyweight category.

Major results

References 

1965 births
Living people
Czech male weightlifters
Weightlifters at the 1988 Summer Olympics
Olympic weightlifters of Czechoslovakia
People from Sokolov
European Weightlifting Championships medalists
Sportspeople from the Karlovy Vary Region